The 1899–1900 season was the seventh season in which Dundee competed at a Scottish national level, playing in Division One and finishing in 6th place. Dundee would also compete in the Scottish Cup. This was the first season Dundee played at their current home of Dens Park, after moving from Carolina Port. The club would also appoint their first ever manager this season with William Wallace.

Scottish Division One 

Statistics provided by Dee Archive

League table

Scottish Cup 

Statistics provided by Dee Archive

Player Statistics 
Statistics provided by Dee Archive

|}

See also 

 List of Dundee F.C. seasons

References 

 

Dundee F.C. seasons
Dundee